Elegia southi is a species of moth of the family Pyralidae. It was described by Reginald James West in 1932 and is found in Taiwan.

References

Moths described in 1932
Phycitini